Taberg is a locality situated in Jönköping Municipality, Jönköping County, Sweden with 4,392 inhabitants in 2010.

References 

Populated places in Jönköping Municipality